Abbott Gleason (21 July 1938 – 25 December 2015) was professor emeritus of history and faculty member at the Watson Institute, Brown University.  He graduated from Harvard University.

Selected publications
 European and Muscovite: Ivan Kireevsky and the Origins of Slavophilism 1972
 Young Russia: The Genesis of Russian Radicalism in the 1860s 1980
 Totalitarianism: The Inner History of the Cold War 1995
 A Liberal Education 2010

References

External links 
http://www.brownalumnimagazine.com/content/view/2497/40/

2015 deaths
Brown University faculty
1938 births
Historians of Russia
American historians
Harvard University alumni